Paleolibertarianism (also known as the "Paleo strategy") is a libertarian political activism strategy aimed at uniting libertarians and paleoconservatives. It was developed by American anarcho-capitalist theorists Murray Rothbard and Lew Rockwell in the American political context after the end of Cold War. From 1989 to 1995, they sought to communicate libertarian notions of opposition to government intervention using messages accessible to working and middle-class people of the time, and combining libertarian Free market views with the cultural conservatism of Paleoconservatism. This approach, usually identified as right-wing populism, was intended to radicalize citizens against the state. The name they chose for this style of activism evoked the roots of modern libertarianism, hence the prefix paleo. That founding movement was American classical liberalism, which shared the anti-war and anti-New Deal sentiments of the Old Right in the first half of the 20th century.

The paleolibertarian strategy was expected to shift the libertarian movement away from the influence of public policy-oriented libertarian organizations based in Washington, D.C. (who were accused of giving up on communicating the complete libertarian message and of adopting the political and cultural values of the Beltway to gain acceptance among the political elite ); and to simultaneously shift American right-wing politics away from the neoconservative movement and its promotion of hawkish or interventionist foreign policy usually characterized as imperialist by libertarian thinkers.

Tenets 
According to Rockwell, the paleolibertarian movement hearkens back to such thinkers as "Ludwig von Mises, Albert Jay Nock, Garet Garrett, and the entire interwar Old Right that opposed the New Deal and favored the Old Republic" and distinguished themselves from neo-libertarians, Beltway libertarianism (a pejorative term used by hardline libertarians to describe libertarians who have gained traction in the Beltway, i.e., Washington, D.C., who are accused of surrendering libertarian values to the Beltway values in order to have better public relations with the Beltway elite), left-libertarianism and lifestyle libertarianism. According to Rockwell, paleolibertarianism "made its peace with religion as the bedrock of liberty, property, and the natural order".

Paleolibertarianism developed in opposition to the link between social avant-garde and libertarianism as if they were indivisible issues. In his 1990's essay "The Case for Paleo-Libertarianism", Rockwell charged mainstream libertarians with "hatred of Western culture". He argued that "pornographic photography, 'free'-thinking, chaotic painting, atonal music, deconstructionist literature, Bauhaus architecture, and modernist films have nothing in common with the libertarian political agenda—no matter how much individual libertarians may revel in them". Of paleolibertarians, he wrote that "we obey, and we ought to obey, traditions of manners and taste". After explaining why libertarians friendly with conventional culture could make a better argument for liberty to the middle classes, Rockwell predicted "in the new movement, libertarians who personify the present corruption will sink to their natural level, as will the Libertarian Party, which has been their diabolic pulpit".

In short, according to Lew Rockwell, the motivation of this "paleo" libertarian movement—in contrast with the "modal" libertarian movement of the Beltway and the Libertarian Party as it existed in the early '90s—was the application of the libertarian principles in ways that lead to the radicalization of the middle classes against the state.

History 
In the 1992 essay "Right-Wing Populism: A Strategy for the Paleo Movement", Rothbard reflected on the ability of libertarians to gain the disaffected working and middle classes using right-wing populism methods to deliver libertarian ideas.

In the 1990s, a "paleoconservative-paleolibertarian alliance was forged", centred on the John Randolph Club founded in 1989 by traditionalist Catholic Thomas Fleming and Rothbard. Rockwell and Rothbard supported paleoconservative Republican candidate Pat Buchanan in the 1992 presidential election and described Buchanan as the political leader of the "paleo movement". In 1992, Rothbard declared that "with Pat Buchanan as our leader, we shall break the clock of social democracy". The Rockwell and Rothbard intention with this alliance was to rebirth an anti-war and anti-welfare right-wing and to fight the neoconservative leadership of the Republican Party in the context of the end of Cold War.

Three years later, Rothbard said Buchanan developed too much faith in economic planning and centralized state power which eventually led paleolibertarians to withdraw their support for Buchanan. In addition to Buchanan's economic nationalism, Paul Gottfried later complained of a lack of funding, infighting, media hostility or blackout and vilification as "racists" and "anti-Semites". The paleolibertarian strategy did not produce practical results and generated little external sympathy. John Randolph Club was disintegrated in 1995 due to incompatibility of ideas and personalities between libertarian and conservative factions.

Rothbard died in 1995. Rockwell asserted in 1999 that with Rothbard's death the paleolibertarian organizing had ended. In 2007, Rockwell stated that he no longer used the term "paleolibertarian"—because it was distorted by its past association with the term paleoconservative as "some kind of socially conservative libertarian", something that "was not the point at all" of paleolibertarianism—and that all libertarians should be "happy with the term libertarian."

Influence 
During the 2016 Republican Party presidential primaries and the campaign for the 2016 United States presidential election, several figures active in 1990s paleolibertarianism expressed levels of sympathy for the messages of then-candidate Donald Trump. Lew Rockwell was sympathetic to Trump's 2016 presidential campaign because of his message against the Republican Party and Democratic Party establishments, as was Rothbardian Justin Raimondo, who voted for Trump on the basis of foreign policy. In a 2016 pre-election debate with Reason editor Nick Gillespie, Austrian School anarcho-capitalist economist Walter Block advised libertarians living in battleground states to support Trump rather than cast their votes for Libertarian Party nominee Gary Johnson, citing the Trump campaign's  foreign policy.

In line with these views, libertarian columnist Ilana Mercer authored a book in June 2016 about presidential candidate Trump titled The Trump Revolution: The Donald's Creative Destruction Deconstructed, a critical examination of then-candidate Trump from a libertarian perspective. In discussing Mercer's book, Objectivist-libertarian scholar Chris Matthew Sciabarra observed that Mercer endorsed "not necessarily the policies of Trump, but 'The Process of Trump'". Scabbarra further noted that "[t]he most interesting of her arguments is the bolstering of liberty by Donald J. Trump [...] smashing an enmeshed political spoils system to bits: the media complex, the political and party complex, the conservative poseur complex. In the age of unconstitutional government—Democratic and Republican—this process of creative destruction can only increase the freedom quotient".

Following the 2022 Libertarian National Convention, the Mises Caucus, a paleolibertarian faction, became the dominant faction on the Libertarian National Committee.

Criticism

Ron Paul newsletters 

The libertarian publication Reason asserted that "a half-dozen longtime libertarian activists—including some still close to Ron Paul—all named the same man as Paul's chief ghostwriter: Ludwig von Mises Institute founder Llewellyn Rockwell, Jr.", although Rockwell denied it.

Notable proponents and organizations

 Murray Rothbard
 Lew Rockwell
 Hans-Hermann Hoppe
 Gary North
 R.J. Rushdoony
 Jeffrey Tucker
 Stefan Molyneux
 Justin Raimondo
 Mises Institute
 Mises Caucus
 Anti-Communist Action
 Property and Freedom Society

See also 

 Alt-lite
 Austrian School
 Coalition for the Renewal of the Republic – Liberty and Hope
 Conservative liberalism
 Criticism of democracy
 Dark Enlightenment
 Hans Hermann Hoppe
 Libertarian conservatism
 Libertarian perspectives on immigration
 National conservatism
 National-anarchism
 Nativism (politics)
 Outline of libertarianism
 Paleoconservatism
 Party of Free Citizens
 Radical right (United States)
 Real Politics Union
 Right-libertarianism
 Right-wing populism

References

External links
 

 
Anarcho-capitalism by form
Libertarianism by form
Libertarianism in the United States
Right-libertarianism